Robert Lucas (born 29 September 1932) is an Indonesian sailor. He competed in the Finn event at the 1968 Summer Olympics.

References

External links
 

1932 births
Living people
Indonesian male sailors (sport)
Olympic sailors of Indonesia
Sailors at the 1968 Summer Olympics – Finn
Sportspeople from Jakarta
20th-century Indonesian people